Stockholm County Museum is the regional museum of Stockholm County, Sweden.
The museum's head office is currently located at Flemingsberg in Huddinge Municipality. Previously, the museum was located at Sickla.

The museum  serves the inhabitants in the county, especially those living in districts without a local museum.  It documents both pre-historical and historical structures in the county and promotes people to visit historical locations by arranging "cultural paths" binding these sites together.  To invite people to learn about the history of the county, the museum has put a large amount of texts and historical images on-line.

It also offers information on how to preserve old buildings and promotes the use of traditional materials when restoring historical structures.

The museum  attempts to put focus on the modern history of Stockholm, including its suburbs
The area covered by the museum encompasses large parts of the Mälaren Valley and the Stockholm Archipelago, an area with more than 700 runestones, and many royal mansions, palaces, as well as many well-preserved homesteads and farmyards giving the landscape its characteristic.

See also 
 History of Stockholm
 Stockholm City Museum
 Västernorrland County Museum

References

External links 

Stockholms läns museum website
  ("Building restoration")
  ("Discover the county")

Museums in Stockholm
History museums in Sweden
Virtual museums